Cladosiphon is a genus of brown algae belonging to the family Chordariaceae.

The genus has cosmopolitan distribution.

Species:

Cladosiphon cylindricus 
Cladosiphon erythraeus 
Cladosiphon irregularis 
Cladosiphon lubricus 
Cladosiphon mediterraneus 
Cladosiphon novae-caledoniae 
Cladosiphon novae-calendoniae 
Cladosiphon occidentalis 
Cladosiphon okamuranus 
Cladosiphon zosterae

References

Chordariaceae
Brown algae genera